Samuel Streeter (September 17, 1900 - August 15, 1985) was an American baseball pitcher in the Negro leagues. He played professionally from 1920 to 1936 with several teams, mostly with the Birmingham Black Barons and the Pittsburgh Crawfords. Streeter started for the East in the inaugural East-West All-Star Game in 1933.

References

External links

 and Baseball-Reference Black Baseball stats and Seamheads

1900 births
1985 deaths
Homestead Grays players
Bacharach Giants players
Baltimore Black Sox players
Birmingham Black Barons players
Pittsburgh Crawfords players
Chicago American Giants players
Cleveland Cubs players
Habana players
Baseball players from Alabama
People from Madison County, Alabama
American expatriate baseball players in Cuba
Baseball pitchers